Vallelonga is a surname. Notable people with the surname include:

Frank Vallelonga, Sr. ( Tony Lip; 1930–2013), American actor and author; father of Nick Vallelonga
Nick Vallelonga (born 1959), American actor, screenwriter, producer, and film director; son of Tony Lip
Tony Vallelonga (born 1946), Italian-born Australian property developer and mayor
Vincenzo Vallelonga (born ?), Australian track and field athlete and Paralympics medalist